Kini Murimurivalu (born 15 May 1989) is a Fijian rugby union footballer. He currently plays for Leicester Tigers having signed in July 2020 and the Fiji national rugby union team and usually plays as a Wing or fullback. 
He was part of the Fiji team at the 2011 Rugby World Cup where he played in three matches, he made his international debut in 2011.

References

External links

1989 births
Living people
Fijian rugby union players
Fiji international rugby union players
Fijian expatriate rugby union players
Expatriate rugby union players in France
Fijian expatriate sportspeople in France
I-Taukei Fijian people
Rugby union wings
Rugby union fullbacks
Leicester Tigers players